Charles Sumner Ashley, Sr. (September 5, 1858 – February 6, 1941) was the Mayor of New Bedford, Massachusetts various times from 1890 to 1936. He served for over 25 terms.

Biography
Charles S. Ashley was born in New Bedford, Massachusetts on September 5, 1858. He was educated at public schools and the Friends' Academy, and worked in the meat trade. In 1890, he and Stephen D. Pierce established the clothing and furnishing firm Ashley & Pierce.

He was elected as mayor of New Bedford first in December 1890, he also served as mayor from 1897 to 1905. He then served from 1910 to 1914; 1917 to 1921; and his final terms were from 1927 to 1936.

He married Anna B. Luce in 1880, and they had three children. In 1891, he remarried to Mrs. Philip B. Purrington.

He died at his home in New Bedford on February 6, 1941.

Legacy
Charles S. Ashley Elementary school in New Bedford, Massachusetts is named in his honor.

References

1858 births
Mayors of New Bedford, Massachusetts
People from New Bedford, Massachusetts
1941 deaths
Massachusetts Democrats